Robiel Yankiel Sol Cervantes (born 1 May 2003) is a Cuban para-athlete specializing in long jump. He represented Cuba at the 2020 Summer Paralympics.

Career
Cervantes represented Cuba in the men's long jump T47 event where he recorded a jump of 7.46 meters, setting a Paralympic record in the T47 category, and won a gold medal, Cuba's first gold medal of the 2020 Summer Paralympics.

References

2003 births
Living people
Paralympic athletes of Cuba
Cuban male long jumpers
Athletes (track and field) at the 2020 Summer Paralympics
Medalists at the 2020 Summer Paralympics
Paralympic gold medalists for Cuba
Paralympic medalists in athletics (track and field)